Armando Lozano Sánchez (born 16 December 1984), known simply as Armando, was a Spanish professional footballer who played as a central defender.

A veteran of 192 Segunda División matches over nine seasons, he scored a combined eight goals for Málaga B, Málaga, Barcelona B, Córdoba and Elche. He also competed professionally in Mexico and the United States.

Club career
Born in Motril, Province of Granada, Armando began playing football in his hometown with Motril CF. In 2002, he moved to Andalusia neighbours Málaga CF to finish his formation, playing his first two professional seasons with its B-team in Segunda División.

In 2006–07, Armando was definitely promoted to the first team, appearing regularly as they were also in the second level. For the following campaign he moved to La Liga with Levante UD, making his competition debut on 17 February 2008 in a 2–1 home win against CA Osasuna; in the middle of a serious financial crisis, the Valencian club would also be relegated.

After a spell with FC Cartagena, which he helped promote to division two, Armando stayed nonetheless in Segunda División B, signing with FC Barcelona's reserves. He was only played regularly in the last season of his three-year spell, starting in all 23 of his second tier appearances under the guidance of new manager Eusebio Sacristán.

On 18 December 2012, after an unassuming spell in Mexico with Tiburones Rojos de Veracruz, Armando returned to his country and joined Córdoba CF in the second division, penning a two-and-a-half-year contract. He made his official debut on 10 January of the following year, playing the full 90 minutes in a 5–0 away loss against former team Barcelona in the Copa del Rey, and appeared regularly during the second half of the league campaign, forming a solid partnership with Kiko.

On 23 January 2014, Armando signed with New York Red Bulls from the Major League Soccer. He appeared in 25 competitive matches in his debut campaign, being waived in early March 2015.

On 8 August 2015, Armando agreed to a two-year deal at second level side Elche CF. On the 30th he scored his first goal for his new team, helping to a 2–1 home win over Bilbao Athletic.

Career statistics

References

External links

1984 births
Living people
People from Motril
Sportspeople from the Province of Granada
Spanish footballers
Footballers from Andalusia
Association football defenders
La Liga players
Segunda División players
Segunda División B players
Motril CF players
Atlético Malagueño players
Málaga CF players
Atlético Levante UD players
Levante UD footballers
FC Cartagena footballers
FC Barcelona Atlètic players
Córdoba CF players
Elche CF players
CF Fuenlabrada footballers
C.D. Veracruz footballers
Major League Soccer players
New York Red Bulls players
Spanish expatriate footballers
Expatriate footballers in Mexico
Expatriate soccer players in the United States
Spanish expatriate sportspeople in Mexico
Spanish expatriate sportspeople in the United States